Louis Gomis (born 6 November 1971) is a French former professional footballer who played as a defender. From 1990 to 2001 he made 78 appearances in Ligue 1 and 48 appearances in Ligue 2 for Girondins de Bordeaux, OGC Nice and Toulouse FC.

Honours
Nice
 Coupe de France: 1997

References

External links
 
 

1971 births
Living people
French sportspeople of Senegalese descent
French footballers
Footballers from Marseille
Association football forwards
Ligue 1 players
Ligue 2 players
FC Girondins de Bordeaux players
OGC Nice players
Toulouse FC players